Pintens is a surname. Notable people with the surname include:

Bea Pintens (born 1972), Belgian short track speed skater
Craig Pintens (born 1975), Athletic Director at Loyola Marymount University
Georges Pintens (born 1946), professional road bicycle racer from Belgium
Henri Pintens, early 20th century Belgian tug of war competitor
Sofie Pintens (born 1974), Belgian short track speed skater

See also
Joseph G. Pinten